Eburobrittium was a Roman town in Lusitania, located near the present town of Óbidos, Portugal.

The city was mentioned by Pliny the Elder as located between Collipo and Olisipo. 
The exact location was only determined by the discovery of archeological finds in the late 20th century. The city was located at the edge of a lagoon that, in Roman times, provided access to the ocean.

Eburobrittium was occupied from the 1st century BC to the second half of the 5th century AD. 
At that time it was abandoned in favour of the more defensible hill where Óbidos Castle is now located.

References

External links
 Official heritage register

Roman towns and cities in Portugal
Óbidos, Portugal